"Swingin' School" is a song released in 1960 by Bobby Rydell. The song was from the film "Because They're Young”. "Swingin' School" spent 12 weeks on the Billboard Hot 100 chart, peaking at No. 5, while reaching No. 11 in Flanders, No. 18 in Wallonia, and No. 44 in the UK's Record Retailer chart. Paired with its flip-side, "Ding-A-Ling", "Swingin' School" reached No. 1 in Australia, and No. 2 on Canada's CHUM Hit Parade, co-charting with Ding-A-Ling.

Paul McCartney reportedly credited “Swinging School” as the inspiration behind the Beatles’ “She Loves You” — specifically the lyric “yeah yeah yeah”.

Chart performance

References

1960 songs
1960 singles
Bobby Rydell songs
Cameo Records singles
Songs written by Bernie Lowe
Songs written by Dave Appell
Songs with lyrics by Kal Mann